Hana Maciuchová (29 November 1945 – 26 January 2021) was a Czech film, television and stage actress. She studied at the Faculty of Theatre in Prague. She was awarded the Czech Medal of Merit in 2010.

Selected filmography 
Krkonošské pohádky (television, 1974)
Chalupáři (television, 1975)
Prázdniny pro psa (1980)
In the Coat of Lioness' Arms (1994)
Loners (2000)
Ulice (television, 2005-2015)
Dobrá čtvrť (television, 2008)

References

External links

1945 births
2021 deaths
Academy of Performing Arts in Prague alumni
Recipients of Medal of Merit (Czech Republic)
Czech film actresses
Czechoslovak film actresses
Czech television actresses
Czech stage actresses
Czechoslovak stage actresses
People from Šternberk
20th-century Czech actresses
21st-century Czech actresses